EpiVax is an American biotechnology company based in Rhode Island. The company was founded in 1998 by Anne Searls De Groot, who serves as its CEO and CSO. EpiVax holds the exclusive license to the EpiMatrix vaccine design technology. In 2020 it developed a COVID-19 vaccine, EPV-CoV19, in partnership with the University of Georgia and Immunomic Therapeutics.

References

External links
 Official website

1998 establishments in Rhode Island
Biotechnology companies of the United States
COVID-19 vaccine producers